Yago Fernández Prieto (born 5 January 1988), known simply as Yago, is a Portuguese former professional footballer who played as a central defender.

Club career

Early years
Born in Lisbon to a Spanish father, Yago played for four clubs during his youth career, starting with hometown's S.L. Benfica at the age of nine then successively representing Sporting CP, Real Madrid and Valencia CF. As a senior, his first spell was with the latter's reserve team in Tercera División, in a promotion-ending campaign.

Subsequently, Yago continued in Spain, playing two years for RCD Espanyol B, helping the side promote to Segunda División B and being relegated in his second season. In January 2010, he returned to his country for an unassuming loan spell with Gil Vicente F.C. in the Segunda Liga (no appearances whatsoever).

Malmö
In July 2010, after not having his contract renewed by Espanyol, Yago was taken on trial by Swedish club Malmö FF, which had just lost Jasmin Sudić with a ruptured cruciate ligament. He played against Fulham in a 0–0 friendly draw, and his performance earned him a contract for the rest of the year, with the deal being confirmed by manager Roland Nilsson.

On 8 December 2010, shortly after winning the Allsvenskan title, Yago signed a new one-year deal with Malmö. However, they chose not to offer him a new contract after the 2011 season.

AEK Athens
In August 2012, following a five-month spell with Girona FC in Segunda División, during which he scored in a 5–3 home win against Xerez CD, Yago agreed to a three-year contract with AEK Athens FC.

Häcken
On 19 August 2013, Yago signed for BK Häcken, thus returning to Sweden. In November, after failing to make an appearance, he left the club.

Oriental
Yago moved to Clube Oriental de Lisboa in early August 2014, after a short stint in Kazakhstan with FC Shakhter Karagandy. He played his first game as a professional in his country on 5 October, featuring the full 90 minutes in a 0–0 home draw against G.D. Chaves.

Club statistics

Honours
Malmö FF
Allsvenskan: 2010

References

External links
Malmö official profile 

1988 births
Living people
Portuguese people of Spanish descent
Footballers from Lisbon
Portuguese footballers
Association football defenders
Liga Portugal 2 players
Segunda Divisão players
Gil Vicente F.C. players
Clube Oriental de Lisboa players
U.D. Leiria players
Segunda División players
Segunda División B players
Tercera División players
Divisiones Regionales de Fútbol players
Valencia CF Mestalla footballers
RCD Espanyol B footballers
Girona FC players
La Roda CF players
CF Torre Levante players
Allsvenskan players
Malmö FF players
BK Häcken players
Super League Greece players
AEK Athens F.C. players
Kazakhstan Premier League players
FC Shakhter Karagandy players
Portugal youth international footballers
Portuguese expatriate footballers
Expatriate footballers in Spain
Expatriate footballers in Sweden
Expatriate footballers in Greece
Expatriate footballers in Kazakhstan
Portuguese expatriate sportspeople in Spain
Portuguese expatriate sportspeople in Sweden
Portuguese expatriate sportspeople in Greece
Portuguese expatriate sportspeople in Kazakhstan